The British Virgin Islands competed at the 2020 Summer Olympics in Tokyo. Originally scheduled to take place from 24 July to 9 August 2020, the Games have been postponed to 23 July to 8 August 2021, because of the COVID-19 pandemic. It was the nation's tenth consecutive appearance at the Summer Olympics.

Competitors
The following is the list of number of competitors in the Games.

Athletics

Athletes from the British Virgin Islands achieved entry standards, either by qualifying time or by world ranking, in the following track and field events (up to a maximum of 3 athletes in each event):

Track & road events

Field events

Swimming

British Virgin Islands received a universality invitation from FINA to send a top-ranked female swimmer in her respective individual events to the Olympics, based on the FINA Points System of June 28, 2021.

See also
British Virgin Islands at the 2019 Pan American Games

References

Nations at the 2020 Summer Olympics
2020
2020 in British Virgin Islands sport